Stephen McCabe is a Labour Party councillor and leader of Inverclyde Council.

He was leader of the local authority between May 2007 and February 2011, when he stepped down for family reasons, but was later re-elected as leader of the local authority in August 2011.

References 

Year of birth missing (living people)
Living people
People from Inverclyde
Scottish Labour councillors
Leaders of local authorities of Scotland